is a Japanese women's association football team which plays in WE League. and become the women's section of J. League club Omiya Ardija.

History
The team started in 1996 as an old girls' club for students of Jumonji Middle School in Toshima Ward, Tokyo. In 2014 they adopted the name "FC Jumonji Ventus" from the Latin word for wind and as a pun on Italian giants Juventus. In 2021 they merged with male club Omiya Ardija, across the prefectural border in Saitama, to participate in WE League.

Kits

Kit suppliers and shirt sponsors

Other sports
The Omiya Ardija Ventus's men's football team is the Omiya Ardija. The club plays in the J2 League, the second tier of football in the country.

Staff

Players

Current squad

Season-by-season records

See also
Japan Football Association (JFA)
2022–23 in Japanese football
List of women's football clubs in Japan

References

External links
Official website 
 

Women's football clubs in Japan
Omiya Ardija
WE League clubs